The Best Of The Seldom Scene is a compilation album by the progressive bluegrass Maryland band The Seldom Scene.

Track listing 
 "City of New Orleans" (Goodman) 2:57
 "Sing Me Back Home" (Haggard) 2:56
 "Muddy Water" (Rosenthal) 3:00
 "500 Miles" (West) 3:17
 "Hello Mary Lou" (Mangiaracina, Pitney) 2:16
 "Small Exception of Me" (Hatch, Trent) 2:58
 "Sweet Baby James" (Taylor) 3:06
 "Heaven" (McSpadden) 2:56
 "With Body and Soul" (Stauffer) 3:56
 "Paradise" (Prine) 2:18
 "Darling Corey" 3:43
 "Cannonball" 2:39
 "Sweetest Gift" (Coats) 2:34
 "Another Lonesome Day" (Thatcher) 2:04
 "Little Georgia Rose" (Monroe) 2:57
 "Rider" (trad.) 5:23

Personnel 
 John Starling - vocals, guitar, mandolin
 John Duffey - mandolin, vocals
 Ben Eldridge - banjo, guitar, vocals
 Mike Auldridge - Dobro, guitar, vocals
 Tom Gray - bass, vocals

with
 Ricky Skaggs - violin, mandolin

References

External links 
 Official site

The Seldom Scene albums
1986 greatest hits albums